"Pissing in a River" is a rock song written by Patti Smith and Ivan Král, and released as a lead single from the Patti Smith Group's 1976 album Radio Ethiopia. It was featured in both the 1980 movie Times Square and the 1997 independent film All Over Me. Nick Hornby describes "Pissing in a River" as one of 31 songs that have provided a soundtrack to his life. It is featured in Episode 3 of Series 2 of the British TV series Clique and in the pilot episode of the 2022 Apple+ TV series Shining Girls. It also appears on Smith's compilations Land and iTunes Originals.

The opening piano chord sequence forms the basis for DJ Shadow's song "Blood on the Motorway". Tori Amos references the song in the track "Space Dog" included in her second studio album Under the Pink.

Notes

External links 
 

1976 singles
Patti Smith songs
Songs written by Patti Smith
Songs written by Ivan Kral
Song recordings produced by Jack Douglas (record producer)
Rock ballads